In mathematics, the lower limit topology or right half-open interval topology is a topology defined on the set  of real numbers; it is different from the standard topology on  (generated by the open intervals) and has a number of interesting properties. It is the topology generated by the basis of all half-open intervals [a,b), where a and b are real numbers.

The resulting topological space is called the Sorgenfrey line after Robert Sorgenfrey  or the arrow and is sometimes written . Like the Cantor set and the long line, the Sorgenfrey line often serves as a useful counterexample to many otherwise plausible-sounding conjectures in general topology.  

In complete analogy, one can also define the upper limit topology, or left half-open interval topology.

Properties 
 The lower limit topology is finer (has more open sets) than the standard topology on the real numbers (which is generated by the open intervals). The reason is that every open interval can be written as a (countably infinite) union of half-open intervals.
This shows that the Sorgenfrey line is totally disconnected.
 Any compact subset of  must be an at most countable set. To see this, consider a non-empty compact subset .

This is true for all . Now choose a rational number . It could be observed that a subset  is compact if and only if it bounded from below and is well-ordered when endowed with the order "" (which in particular implies that it is bounded from above).

 The name "lower limit topology" comes from the following fact: a sequence (or net)  in  converges to the limit  if and only if it "approaches  from the right", meaning for every  there exists an index  such that .
 In terms of separation axioms,  is a perfectly normal Hausdorff space.
 In terms of countability axioms,  is first-countable and separable, but not second-countable.
 In terms of compactness properties,  is Lindelöf and paracompact, but not σ-compact nor locally compact.
  is not metrizable, since separable metric spaces are second-countable. However, the topology of a Sorgenfrey line is generated by a quasimetric.
  is a Baire space.
  does not have any connected compactifications.

See also 

 List of topologies

References 

 

Topological spaces